Depressaria daucella is a moth of the family Depressariidae. It is found in most of Europe, except most of the Balkan Peninsula. It is also found in North America.

The wingspan is 21–24 mm. The terminal joint of palpi with two blackish bands. Forewings light brown, somewhat whitish-sprinkled, sometimes slightly reddish-tinged ; numerous dark fuscous dashes ; two indicating discal stigmata, between which is sometimes a line of pale scales ; an obscure pale very acutely angulated fascia at 3/4. Hindwings fuscous-whitish,more fuscous posteriorly ; 5 connate with stalk of 3 and 4.The larva is dark bluish -grey; lateral line orange yellow; spots black, white-circled; head black; plate of 2 black, bisected, anterior edge whitish anteriorly 

Adults are on wing from September and after overwintering, again to April.

The larvae are leaf miners and feed on plants including, Sison amomum, Carum verticillatum, Cicuta virosa, Oenanthe aquatica, Oenanthe crocata, Oenanthe fistulosa,  and Oenanthe pimpinelloides. Older larvae mostly live communally in spun leaves or the inflorescence. When full-grown, they bore through the wall of the stem and pupate in a cocoon in the hollow interior. Larvae can be found from June to the end of July. They are bluish grey with a bright yellow line and a black head.

Gallery

References

External links
 
 lepiforum.de

Depressaria
Moths described in 1775
Moths of Europe
Moths of North America
Leaf miners
Taxa named by Michael Denis
Taxa named by Ignaz Schiffermüller